Lonwabo Lennox Tsotsobe (born 7 March 1984) is a former South African international cricketer who played for the Dolphins.

In November 2008, he received his first national call-up, with his selection for the test leg of the tour of Australia. He was later selected for the ODI leg as well.

In April 2011, Tsotsobe signed to play as an overseas player for Essex County Cricket Club in English county cricket. His form dipped and after taking five wickets from three first-class matches in the second division of the County Championship was dropped from the team. In five one-day matches Tsotsobe managed eight wickets. He expressed his frustration at the situation, remarking that the time he spent with Essex was "the worst two months [of his] life".

In April 2016, he was charged by Cricket South Africa (CSA) with corruption in relation to matches in the 2015–16 Ram Slam T20 Challenge. He was suspended from all cricket as a result. In July 2017, following the completion of the corruption investigation, he was banned for eight years.

International career

Tsotsobe made his international debut for South Africa in a Twenty20 International against Australia at the Melbourne Cricket Ground on 11 January 2009.

On 30 January, he took 4/50 from nine overs in his ODI debut against Australia. South Africa went on to win the match by 39 runs, and the ODI series by 4–1.

He made his Test debut in the first match against the West Indies in Trinidad in June 2010.

He then participated in the second Twenty20 International vs Zimbabwe in place of the injured Morné Morkel and after conceding two fours in his opening over he took the crucial wicket of Hamilton Masakadza. He was a member of the South African squad for the 2011 World Cup, in which South Africa reached the quarter-finals. Tsotsobe is said to have the ability to produce low economy rates and bowl deliveries between 120 and 135 km/h.

References

External links
 

1984 births
Living people
Cricketers from Port Elizabeth
South African cricketers
South Africa Test cricketers
South Africa One Day International cricketers
South Africa Twenty20 International cricketers
Eastern Province cricketers
Warriors cricketers
Cricketers at the 2011 Cricket World Cup
Essex cricketers
Cricketers banned for corruption